The Party for National Unity and Solidarity (KTPI) is a political party in Suriname historically supported by Javanese Surinamese.

History 
The party was founded by Iding Soemita on 28 November 1949.  He led the party until 1972, when his son Willy Soemita succeeded him as party chairman.  Willy Soemita retired November 2019, and Iwan Ganga became the new leader.  Ganga is the first non-Javanese chairman; he joined from the VHP in 2000.

Electoral results

References 

Political parties in Suriname
Political parties of minorities